The Common Security and Defence Policy (CSDP) is the European Union's (EU) course of action in the fields of defence and crisis management, and a main component of the EU's Common Foreign and Security Policy (CFSP).

The CSDP involves the deployment of military or civilian missions to preserve peace, prevent conflict and strengthen international security in accordance with the principles of the United Nations Charter. Military missions are carried out by EU forces established with secondments from the member states' armed forces. The CSDP also entails collective self-defence amongst member states as well as a Permanent Structured Cooperation (PESCO) in which 25 of the 27 national armed forces pursue structural integration. The CSDP structure – headed by the Union's High Representative (HR/VP), Josep Borrell, and sometimes referred to as the European Defence Union (EDU) in relation to its prospective development as the EU's defence arm – comprises:

the European Commission's Defence Industry Directorate-General
the External Action Service's (EEAS) Crisis Management and Planning Directorate (CMPD) and permanent Operation Headquarters (OHQs) for command and control (C2) at the military/civilian strategic level, i.e. the MPCC and CPCC.
a number of Foreign Affairs Council (FAC) preparatory bodies – such as the Military Committee (EUMC)
four agencies, including the Defence Agency (EDA)

The EU command and control structures are much smaller than the North Atlantic Treaty Organization's (NATO) Command Structure (NCS), which has been established for territorial defence. It has been agreed that NATO's Allied Command Operations (ACO) may be used for the conduct of the EU's missions. The MPCC, established in 2017 and to be strengthened in 2020, is the EU's first permanent military OHQ. In parallel, the newly established European Defence Fund (EDF) marks the first time the EU budget is used to finance multinational defence projects.

Decisions relating to the CSDP are proposed by the High Representative, adopted by the Foreign Affairs Council, generally requiring unanimity, to be then implemented by the High Representative.

History

The post-war period saw several short-lived or ill-fated initiatives for European defence integration intended to protect against potential Soviet or German aggression: The Western Union (WU, also referred to as the Brussels Treaty Organisation, BTO) and the proposed European Defence Community (EDC) were respectively cannibalised by the North Atlantic Treaty Organisation (NATO) and rejected by the French Parliament. The largely dormant Western European Union (WEU) succeeded the WU's remainder in 1955.

In 1970 the European Political Cooperation (EPC) brought about the European Communities' (EC) initial foreign policy coordination. Opposition to the addition of security and defence matters to the EPC led to the reactivation of the WEU in 1984 by its member states, which were also EC member states.

European defence integration gained momentum soon after the end of the Cold War, partly as a result of the EC's failure to prevent the Yugoslav Wars. In 1992, the WEU was given new tasks, and the following year the Treaty of Maastricht founded the EU and replaced the EPC with the Common Foreign and Security Policy (CFSP) pillar. In 1996 NATO agreed to let the WEU develop a so-called European Security and Defence Identity (ESDI). The 1998 St. Malo declaration signalled that the traditionally hesitant United Kingdom was prepared to provide the EU with autonomous defence structures. This facilitated the transformation of the ESDI into the European Security and Defence Policy (ESDP) in 1999, when it was transferred to the EU. In 2003 the EU deployed its first CSDP missions, and adopted the European Security Strategy identifying common threats and objectives. In 2009, the Treaty of Lisbon introduced the present name, CSDP, while establishing the EEAS, the mutual defence clause and enabling a subset of member states to pursue defence integration within PESCO. In 2011 the WEU, whose tasks had been transferred to the EU, was dissolved. In 2016 a new security strategy was introduced, which along with the Russian annexation of Crimea, the British withdrawal from the EU and the election of Trump as US president have given the CSDP a new impetus.

Deployments

The first deployment of European troops under the ESDP, following the 1999 declaration of intent, was in March 2003 in the former Yugoslav Republic of Macedonia (FYROM, today: North Macedonia). Operation Concordia used NATO assets and was considered a success and replaced by a smaller police mission, EUPOL Proxima, later that year. Since then, there have been other small police, justice and monitoring missions. As well as in the FYROM, the EU has maintained its deployment of peacekeepers in Bosnia and Herzegovina, as part of Operation Althea.

Between May and September 2003 EU troops were deployed to the Democratic Republic of the Congo (DRC) during "Operation Artemis" under a mandate given by UN Security Council Resolution 1484 which aimed to prevent further atrocities and violence in the Ituri Conflict and put the DRC's peace process back on track. This laid out the "framework nation" system to be used in future deployments. The EU returned to the DRC during July–November 2006 with EUFOR RD Congo, which supported the UN mission there during the country's elections.

Geographically, EU missions outside the Balkans and the DRC have taken place in Georgia, Indonesia, Sudan, Palestine, and Ukraine–Moldova. There is also a judicial mission in Iraq (EUJUST Lex). On 28 January 2008, the EU deployed its largest and most multi-national mission to Africa, EUFOR Tchad/RCA. The UN-mandated mission involves troops from 25 EU states (19 in the field) deployed in areas of eastern Chad and the north-eastern Central African Republic in order to improve security in those regions. EUFOR Tchad/RCA reached full operation capability in mid-September 2008, and handed over security duties to the UN (MINURCAT mission) in mid-March 2009.

The EU launched its first maritime CSDP operation on 12 December 2008 (Operation Atalanta).  The concept of the European Union Naval Force (EU NAVFOR) was created on the back of this operation, which is still successfully combatting piracy off the coast of Somalia almost a decade later.  A second such intervention was launched in 2015 to tackle migration problems in the southern Mediterranean (EUNAVFOR Med), working under the name Operation SOPHIA.

Most of the CSDP missions deployed so far are mandated to support security sector reforms (SSR) in host-states. One of the core principles of CSDP support to SSR is local ownership. The EU Council defines ownership as "the appropriation by the local authorities of the commonly agreed objectives and principles". Despite EU's strong rhetorical attachment to the local ownership principle, research shows that CSDP missions continue to be an externally driven, top-down and supply-driven endeavour, resulting often in the low degree of local participation.

Structure

The CSDP involves military or civilian missions being deployed to preserve peace, prevent conflict and strengthen international security in accordance with the principles of the United Nations Charter. Military missions are carried out by EU forces established with contributions from the member states' armed forces. The CSDP also entails collective self-defence amongst member states as well as a Permanent Structured Cooperation (PESCO) in which 25 of the 27 national armed forces pursue structural integration. The CSDP structure, headed by the Union's High Representative (HR/VP), Josep Borrell, comprises:
the Defence Industry Directorate-General of the European Commission
relevant sections of the External Action Service (EEAS) — including the Military Staff (EUMS) with its so-called Military Planning and Conduct Capability (MPCC)
a number of Foreign Affairs Council (FAC) preparatory bodies – such as the Military Committee (EUMC)
four agencies, including the Defence Agency (EDA)

While the EU has a command and control (C2) structure, it has no standing permanent military structure along the lines of the North Atlantic Treaty Organization's (NATO) Allied Command Operations (ACO), although it has been agreed that ACO resources may be used for the conduct of the EU's CSDP missions. The MPCC, established in 2017 and to be strengthened in 2020, does however represent the EU's first step in developing a permanent military headquarters. In parallel, the newly established European Defence Fund (EDF) marks the first time the EU budget is used to finance multinational defence projects. The CSDP structure is sometimes referred to as the European Defence Union (EDU), especially in relation to its prospective development as the EU's defence arm.

Decisions relating to the CSDP are proposed by the HR/VP, adopted by the FAC, generally requiring unanimity, and then implemented by the HR/VP.

Strategy

The European Union Global Strategy (EUGS) is the updated doctrine of the EU to improve the effectiveness of the CSDP, including the defence and security of the members states, the protection of civilians, cooperation between the member states' armed forces, management of immigration, crises etc. Adopted on 28 June 2016, it replaces the European Security Strategy of 2003. The EUGS is complemented by a document titled "Implementation Plan on Security and Defense" (IPSD).

Forces

A new Action Plan on military mobility and cyber resilience was released 10 November 2022.

National

The CSDP is implemented using civilian and military contributions from member states' armed forces, which also are obliged to collective self-defence based on Treaty on European Union (TEU).

Five EU states host nuclear weapons: France has its own nuclear programmes, while Belgium, Germany, Italy and the Netherlands host US nuclear weapons as part of NATO's nuclear sharing policy. Combined, the EU possesses 300 warheads, and hosts between 90 and 130 US warheads. Italy hosts 70-90 B61 nuclear bombs, while Germany, Belgium, and the Netherlands 10-20 each one. The EU has the third largest arsenal of nuclear weapons, after the United States and Russia.

Expenditure and personnel

The following table presents the military expenditures of the members of the European Union in euros (€). The combined military expenditure of the member states amounted to €223.4 billion in 2018. This represents 1.4% of European Union GDP. European military expenditure includes spending on joint projects such as the Eurofighter Typhoon and joint procurement of equipment. The European Union's combined active military forces in 2016 totaled 1,410,626 personnel.

In a speech in 2012, Swedish General Håkan Syrén criticised the spending levels of European Union countries, saying that in the future those countries' military capability will decrease, creating "critical shortfalls".

Guide to table:
 All figure entries in the table below are provided by the European Defence Agency for the year 2017, except for Germany's personnel figure, which is for 2016. Figures from other sources are not included.
 The "operations & maintenance expenditure" category may in some circumstances also include finances on-top of the nations defence budget.
 The categories "troops prepared for deployed operations" and "troops prepared for deployed and sustained operation" only include land force personnel.

Naval forces

The combined component strength of the naval forces of member states is some 514 commissioned warships. Of those in service, 4 are fleet carriers. The EU also has 4 amphibious assault ships and 20 amphibious support ships in service. Of the EU's 49 submarines, 10 are nuclear-powered submarines while 39 are conventional attack submarines.

Operation Atalanta (formally European Union Naval Force Somalia) is the first ever (and still ongoing) naval operation of the European Union. It is part of a larger global action by the EU in the Horn of Africa to deal with the Somali crisis. As of January 2011 twenty-three EU nations participate in the operation.

France and Italy have blue-water navies.

Guide to table:
 Ceremonial vessels, research vessels, supply vessels, training vessels, and icebreakers are not included.
 The table only counts warships that are commissioned (or equivalent) and active.
 Surface vessels displacing less than 200 tonnes are not included, regardless of other characteristics.
 The "amphibious support ship" category includes amphibious transport docks and dock landing ships, and tank landing ships.
 Frigates over 6,000 tonnes are classified as destroyers.
 The "patrol vessel" category includes missile boats.
 The "anti-mine ship" category includes mine countermeasures vessels, minesweepers and minehunters.
 Generally, total tonnage of ships is more important than total number of ships, as it gives a better indication of capability.

Land forces

Combined, the member states of the European Union maintain large numbers of various land-based military vehicles and weaponry.

Guide to table:
 The table is not exhaustive and primarily includes vehicles and EU-NATO member countries under the Conventional Armed Forces in Europe Treaty (CFE treaty). Unless otherwise specified.
 The CFE treaty only includes vehicles stationed within Europe, vehicles overseas on operations are not counted.
 The "main battle tank" category also includes tank destroyers (such as the Italian B1 Centauro) or any self-propelled armoured fighting vehicle, capable of heavy firepower. According to the CFE treaty.
 The "armoured fighting vehicle" category includes any armoured vehicle primarily designed to transport infantry and equipped with an automatic cannon of at least 20 mm calibre. According to the CFE treaty.
 The "artillery" category includes self-propelled or towed howitzers and mortars of 100 mm calibre and above. Other types of artillery are not included regardless of characteristics. According to the CFE treaty.
 The "attack helicopter" category includes any rotary wing aircraft armed and equipped to engage targets or equipped to perform other military functions (such as the Apache or the Wildcat). According to the CFE treaty.
 The "military logistics vehicle" category includes logistics trucks of 4-tonne, 8-tonne, 14-tonne or larger, purposely designed for military tasking. Not under CFE treaty.

Air forces

The air forces of EU member states operate a wide range of military systems and hardware. This is primarily due to the independent requirements of each member state and also the national defence industries of some member states. However such programmes like the Eurofighter Typhoon and Eurocopter Tiger have seen many European nations design, build and operate a single weapons platform. 60% of overall combat fleet was developed and manufactured by member states, 32% are US-origin, but some of these were assembled in Europe, while remaining 8% are soviet-made aircraft. As of 2014, it is estimated that the European Union had around 2,000 serviceable combat aircraft (fighter aircraft and ground-attack aircraft).

The EUs air-lift capabilities are evolving with the future introduction of the Airbus A400M (another example of EU defence cooperation). The A400M is a tactical airlifter with strategic capabilities. Around 140 are initially expected to be operated by 5 member states (Luxembourg, France, Germany, Spain and Belgium).

Guide to tables:
 The tables are sourced from figures provided by Flight International for the year 2020.
 Aircraft are grouped into three main types (indicated by colours): <span style="color:red">red</span style="color:red"> for combat aircraft, <span style="color:green">green</span style="color:green"> for aerial refueling aircraft, and <span style="color:silver">grey</span style="color:silver"> for strategic and tactical transport aircraft.
 The two "other" columns include additional aircraft according to their type sorted by colour (i.e. the "other" category in red includes combat aircraft, while the "other" category in grey includes both aerial refueling and transport aircraft). This was done because it was not feasible allocate every aircraft type its own column.
 Other aircraft such as trainers, helicopters, UAVs and reconnaissance or surveillance aircraft are not included in the below tables or figures.

Fighter and ground-attack

Aerial refueling and transport

Multinational

Established at Union level

The Helsinki Headline Goal Catalogue is a listing of rapid reaction forces composed of 60,000 troops managed by the European Union, but under control of the countries who deliver troops for it.

Forces introduced at Union level include:
The battle groups (BG) adhere to the CSDP, and are based on contributions from a coalition of member states. Each of the eighteen Battlegroups consists of a battalion-sized force (1,500 troops) reinforced with combat support elements. The groups rotate actively, so that two are ready for deployment at all times. The forces are under the direct control of the Council of the European Union. The Battlegroups reached full operational capacity on 1 January 2007, although, as of January 2013 they are yet to see any military action. They are based on existing ad hoc missions that the European Union (EU) has undertaken and has been described by some as a new "standing army" for Europe. The troops and equipment are drawn from the EU member states under a "lead nation". In 2004, United Nations Secretary-General Kofi Annan welcomed the plans and emphasised the value and importance of the Battlegroups in helping the UN deal with troublespots.
The Medical Command (EMC) is a planned medical command centre in support of EU missions, formed as part of the Permanent Structured Cooperation (PESCO). The EMC will provide the EU with a permanent medical capability to support operations abroad, including medical resources and a rapidly deployable medical task force. The EMC will also provide medical evacuation facilities, triage and resuscitation, treatment and holding of patients until they can be returned to duty, and emergency dental treatment. It will also contribute to harmonising medical standards, certification and legal (civil) framework conditions.
The Force Crisis Response Operation Core (EUFOR CROC) is a flagship defence project under development as part of Permanent Structured Cooperation (PESCO). EURFOR CROC will contribute to the creation of a "full spectrum force package" to speed up provision of military forces and the EU's crisis management capabilities. Rather than creating a standing force, the project involves creating a concrete catalogue of military force elements that would speed up the establishment of a force when the EU decides to launch an operation. It is land-focused and aims to generate a force of 60,000 troops from the contributing states alone. While it does not establish any form of "European army", it foresees an deployable, interoperable force under a single command. Germany is the lead country for the project, but the French are heavily involved and it is tied to President Emmanuel Macron's proposal to create a standing intervention force. The French see it as an example of what PESCO is about.

Provided through Article 42.3 TEU
 
This section presents an incomplete list of forces and bodies established intergovernmentally amongst a subset of member states. These organisations will deploy forces based on the collective agreement of their member states. They are typically technically listed as being able to be deployed under the auspices of NATO, the United Nations, the European Union (EU) through Article 42.3 of TEU, the Organization for Security and Co-operation in Europe, or any other international entity.

However, with the exception of the Eurocorps, very few have actually been deployed for any real military operation, and none under the CSDP at any point in its history.

Land Forces:
The Eurocorps is an army corps of approximately 1,000 soldiers stationed in Strasbourg, France. Based in the French city of Strasbourg, the corps is the nucleus of the Franco-German Brigade.
The I. German/Dutch Corps is a multinational formation consisting of units from the Dutch and German armies. Due to its role as a NATO High Readiness Forces Headquarters, soldiers from other NATO member states, the United States, Denmark, Norway, Spain, Italy, the United Kingdom amongst others, are also stationed at Münster.
 The Multinational Corps Northeast, a Danish-German-Polish multinational corps
 The European Gendarmerie Force, an intervention force with militarised police functions which specializes in crisis management.

Aerial:
The European Air Transport Command exercises operational control of the majority of the aerial refueling capabilities and military transport fleets of its participating nations. Located at Eindhoven Airbase in the Netherlands, the command also bears a limited responsibility for exercises, aircrew training and the harmonisation of relevant national air transport regulations. The command was established in 2010 to provide a more efficient management of the participating nations' assets and resources in this field.

Naval:
The European Maritime Force (EUROMARFOR or EMF) is a non-standing, military force that may carry out naval, air and amphibious operations, with an activation time of 5 days after an order is received. The force was formed in 1995 to fulfill missions defined in the Petersberg Declaration, such as sea control, humanitarian missions, peacekeeping operations, crisis response operations, and peace enforcement.

Participation, relationship with NATO

Out of the 27 EU member states, 21 are also members of NATO. Another four NATO members are EU applicants—Albania, Montenegro, North Macedonia and Turkey. Two others—Iceland and Norway—have opted to remain outside of the EU, however participate in the EU's single market. The memberships of the EU and NATO are distinct, and some EU member states are traditionally neutral on defence issues. Several EU member states were formerly members of the Warsaw Pact. Denmark had an opt-out from the CSDP, however voted in a referendum in 2022 to begin to participate in the policy area.

The Berlin Plus agreement is the short title of a comprehensive package of agreements made between NATO and the EU on 16 December 2002. These agreements were based on conclusions of NATO's 1999 Washington summit, sometimes referred to as the CJTF mechanism, and allowed the EU to draw on some of NATO's military assets in its own peacekeeping operations.

See also

European Union as an emerging superpower
European countries by military expenditure as a percentage of government expenditure

Other defence-related EU initiatives:
Military Mobility
European Centre of Excellence for Countering Hybrid Threats (Hybrid CoE), an EU-supported intergovernmental think-tank

Other Pan-European defence organisations (intergovernmental):
Organisation for Joint Armament Cooperation (OCCAR)
Finabel, an organisation, controlled by the army chiefs of staff of its participating nations, that promotes cooperation and interoperability between the armies.
Organisation for Joint Armament Cooperation (OCCAR), an organisation that facilitates and manages collaborative armament programmes through their lifecycle between its participating nations.
European Air Group (EAG), an organisation that promotes cooperation and interoperability between the air forces of its participating nations.
European Organisation of Military Associations and Trade Unions (EUROMIL)
European Personnel Recovery Centre (EPRC), an organisation that contributes to the development and harmonisation of policies and standards related to personnel recovery.
European Intervention Initiative

Regional, integorvernmental defence organisations in Europe:
Nordic Defence Cooperation (NORDEFCO)
Central European Defence Cooperation (CEDC)

Atlanticist intergovernmental defence organisations:
North Atlantic Treaty Organisation (NATO)
Movement Coordination Centre Europe (MCCE), an organisation aiming to coordinate the use of airlift, sealift and land movement assets owned or leased by participating nations.

Notes

References

Further reading
Book – What ambitions for European defence in 2020?, European Union Institute for Security Studies
Book – European Security and Defence Policy: The first 10 years (1999–2009), European Union Institute for Security Studies
Book - Smith, Michael E. (2017). 'Europe's Common Security and Defence Policy: Capacity-Building, Experiential Learning, and Institutional Change' (Cambridge University Press).
"Guide to the ESDP" nov.2008 edition Exhaustive guide on ESDP's missions, institutions and operations, written and edited by the Permanent representation of France to the European Union.

PhD Thesis on Civilian ESDP - EU Civilian crisis management (University of Geneva, 2008, 441 p. in French)

 Giovanni Arcudi & Michael E. Smith (2013). The European Gendarmerie Force: a solution in search of problems?, European Security, 22(1): 1–20, DOI:10.1080/09662839.2012.747511
 Teresa Eder (2014). Welche Befugnisse hat die Europäische Gendarmerietruppe?, Der Standard, 5 Februar 2014.
 Alexander Mattelaer (2008). The Strategic Planning of EU Military Operations – The Case of EUFOR Tchad/RCA, IES Working Paper 5/2008.
 Benjamin Pohl (2013). The logic underpinning EU crisis management operations, European Security, 22(3): 307–325, DOI:10.1080/09662839.2012.726220
 "The Russo-Georgian War and Beyond: towards a European Great Power Concert", Danish Institute of International Studies.
 U.S Army Strategic Studies Institute (SSI), Operation EUFOR TCHAD/RCA and the EU's Common Security and Defense Policy., U.S. Army War College, October 2010
 Mai'a K. Davis Cross "Security Integration in Europe: How Knowledge-based Networks are Transforming the European Union." University of Michigan Press, 2011.

External links

 , European External Action Service
 Security and Defence, European External Action Service
 EU cooperation on security and defence, Council of the European Union
 CFSP operational instrument: A proposed CSDP evolution in the Eurocorps and ESDI in NATO